César González Navas (born 14 February 1980) is a Spanish former footballer who played as a central defender.

In his country, he played professionally for Málaga B, Málaga, Gimnàstic and Racing de Santander, amassing La Liga totals of 106 matches and six goals over five seasons. In 2009 he signed for Rubin Kazan, remaining in the Russian Premier League until his retirement.

Club career
Born in Móstoles, Community of Madrid, Navas was brought through the ranks of hometown's Real Madrid, but only played with its B-team. He made his La Liga debuts in the 2004–05 season, going on to spend two years in the competition with Málaga CF: his first match was on 12 December 2004, as he featured the full 90 minutes in a 1–0 home win against Levante UD.

In January 2007, Navas left Málaga and the second division and played for six months on loan with top flight strugglers (eventually relegated) Gimnàstic de Tarragona. After his return to Andalusia he had a trial with English club Ipswich Town, but an eventual deal fell through due to a metatarsal injury; he subsequently joined Racing de Santander also in the top level, signing for two years.

A habitual starter throughout the first half of the 2008–09 campaign, Navas was sold in late February 2009 to Russia's FC Rubin Kazan, on a three-year deal worth €2 million. He appeared in 28 games in his first year, as the team renewed their Russian Premier League supremacy.

On 12 July 2015, 35-year-old Navas signed a one-year contract with FC Rostov, agreeing to an extension one year later. On 9 June 2017, he left the Olimp-2.

On 31 August 2017, Rubin Kazan announced the return of Navas. On 14 February 2019, the 39-year-old announced his retirement.

Career statistics

Honours
Rubin Kazan
Russian Premier League: 2009
Russian Cup: 2011–12
Russian Super Cup: 2010, 2012

References

External links

1980 births
Living people
People from Móstoles
Spanish footballers
Footballers from the Community of Madrid
Association football defenders
La Liga players
Segunda División players
Segunda División B players
Real Madrid Castilla footballers
Atlético Malagueño players
Málaga CF players
Gimnàstic de Tarragona footballers
Racing de Santander players
Russian Premier League players
FC Rubin Kazan players
FC Rostov players
Spain youth international footballers
Spanish expatriate footballers
Expatriate footballers in Russia
Spanish expatriate sportspeople in Russia